Ana María Baiardi Quesnel (born Asunción, Paraguay; 17 July 1965) is a Paraguayan diplomat and politician. Is currently ambassador of the Republic of Paraguay in Peru.

Biography
Baiardi studied Systems Analysis at the Universidad Católica Nuestra Señora de la Asunción; afterwards she specialized in Social Science at the Long Island University, New York, and she obtained a Master in International Integration from the University of Perugia, Italy.

From 2008 to 15 August 2013 she was Paraguayan ambassador to Italy, Israel, Greece and Slovenia.

On 15 August 2013 she was sworn in as Minister for Women of Paraguay in the cabinet of President Horacio Cartes.

References

External links
 Official website - Minister Baiardi 

1965 births
Universidad Católica Nuestra Señora de la Asunción alumni
Long Island University alumni
Paraguayan people of Italian descent
University of Perugia alumni
Paraguayan women diplomats
Ambassadors of Paraguay to Greece
Ambassadors of Paraguay to Israel
Ambassadors of Paraguay to Italy
Government ministers of Paraguay
Women's ministers
Living people
21st-century Paraguayan women politicians
21st-century Paraguayan politicians
Women government ministers of Paraguay
Women ambassadors